It was observed in evolution strategies that significant progress toward the fitness/objective function's optimum, generally, can only happen in a narrow band of the mutation step size σ. That narrow band is called evolution window.

There are three well-known methods to adapt the mutation step size σ in evolution strategies:

 (1/5-th) Success Rule
 Self-Adaptation (for example through log-normal mutations)
 Cumulative Step Size Adaptation (CSA)

On simple functions all of them have been empirically shown to keep the step size within the evolution window.

See also

 Bionics
 Cybernetics
 Evolutionary Algorithm
 Evolution strategy
 Optimization (mathematics)

References

 H.-G. Beyer. Toward a Theory of Evolution Strategies: Self-Adaptation. Evolutionary Computation, 3(3), 311-347.
 Ingo Rechenberg: Evolutionsstrategie '94. Stuttgart: Frommann-Holzboog 1994.

Evolutionary algorithms